Irvington station may refer to:
Irvington station (BART), in Fremont, California
Irvington station (Metro-North), in Irvington, New York